Il Post is an Italian on-line daily newspaper, founded and directed in 2010 by Luca Sofri. The editorial staff includes journalists Arianna Cavallo, Francesco Costa, Luca Misculin, Elena Zacchetti, Giulia Balducci and Emanuele Menietti, as well as contributions from Luca Sofri and a number of other collaborators. The business model is based on revenue from advertising, since reading the newspaper is free and requires no registration; the newspaper is also sponsored by a group of investors of whom the main partner is the Banzai company, an Italian Internet holding company that controls the graphic design, technological aspects and advertising revenues.

Presentation
The design and name recall those of historical American newspapers such as the Washington Post, as well as its blog while the content reflects the style of the Huffington Post,
 and US online newspapers such as Slate and The Daily Beast. Sofri presented the project as "An elite product for majorities: in the end we are always onto facts and opinions, even though there is no separation between facts and opinions', and is innovative in being 'half aggregator (another misconception), and half publisher of blogs.'

History
Launched on 19 April 2010, Il Post was conceived as an aggregator of the best content of the Italian and international press, selected and commented by the editors, supported by original content produced by the same editors and several collaborators, such as Debora Serracchiani, Andrea Romano, Ivan Scalfarotto, Giuseppe Civati, Flavia Perina, Antonio Dini. The lead also features the blogs of some illustrators and cartoonists, including Makkox who periodically publishes topical cartoons. Since May 2012 Il Post is the only Italian newspaper - online or on paper - to publish the comic strips Peanuts and Doonesbury every day.

Award
In 2011, Il Post won the third edition of the Premio Ischia Social Network for online information, presented during the Ischia InternationalJournalism Awards.

Internet presence
According to Alexa, Il Post appears to be in the top 200 most visited websites in Italy.

In January 2012, Audiweb recorded an increase in daily visitors of 61 percent, one of the highest growth rates in Italy  in the previous year in January, among online newspapers and in November 2014 it had 283,000 unique visitors.

Financial restructuring
In May 2013, following a recapitalization to cover the losses of the company, respectively 360,000 euro in 2011 and 480,000 euro in 2012, the chair of the Board of Directors passed to Paul Ainio, CEO of Banzai SpA, which holds the majority of its stock. The news was made public on July 23 in Italia Oggi, a political and financial daily newspaper, in a short article which gave an account of the new allocation of the shares, as being: Banzai 30.53%, Kme different Inc. View and about 24% each, Giorgio Gori Sofri 8% and 10.9%. The next day Paul Ainio wrote to Italia Oggi, claiming the figures to be fictitious, outlining how after asuccessful reorganization Banzai and Sofri had increased their shares, to respectively to 24% and 22% respectively. The journalist Plazzotta, author of the article, has in turn responded that his report was the result of the reading of the notes to the 2012 budget of Il Post Srl, from which the data were taken, and that the control rates quoted in the article (Banzai ventures to 30.53% and Sofri 8%) are described in the Company Chamber certificate of 22 July 2013.

References

External links

2010 establishments in Italy
European news websites
Italian-language newspapers
Newspapers published in Milan
Newspapers established in 2010
Daily newspapers published in Italy